Auaxa cesadaria is a moth of the  family Geometridae. It is found in Taiwan, China and Japan.

The wingspan is 33–39 mm.

References

Moths described in 1860
Ennominae
Moths of Asia